Sampson Adu Gyamfi is a Ghanaian politician and a member of the first Parliament of the fourth Republic Representing the Atwima-Kwanwoma constituency in the Ashanti Region of Ghana.

Early life and education 
Adu-Gyamfi was born on 7 May 1950 at Kokobeng, a town in the Ashanti Region of Ghana. He attended the Osei Tutu Training College where he obtained his Teachers' Training Certificate, and the Management Development And Productivity Institute (MDPI) where he studied various courses including Transport and Communication.

Politics 
Adu-Gyamfi was elected into parliament on the ticket of the National Democratic Congress during the December 1992 Ghanaian parliamentary election to represent the Atwima-Kwanwoma Constituency in the Ashanti Region of Ghana. He lost his seat to his opponent Dr. Matthew Kwaku Antwi of the opposition New Patriotic Party after he was defeated in his party's parliamentary primaries by Simon Atta. During the 1996 Ghanaian general election, Dr. Matthew Kwaku Antwi Polled 18,056 votes out of the total valid votes cast representing 58.80% over his opponents Simon Atta of the National Democratic Congress who polled 4,831 votes representing 15.70% and Kwasi Amakwa Manu of the Convention People's Party who also polled 293 votes representing 1.00%.

Career 
Adu-Gyamfi is a teacher by profession and a former member of Parliament for the Atwima-Kwanwoma Constituency in the Ashanti Region of Ghana.

Religion 
He is a Christian.

References 

Living people
1950 births
Ghanaian MPs 1993–1997
National Democratic Congress (Ghana) politicians
Ghanaian Christians
People from Ashanti Region
Ghanaian educators